Jerome Lincoln Seelen (March 11, 1912 - September 12, 1981) was an American screenwriter and lyricist .

Biography
Jerry Seelen wrote lyrics for songs in musical films and wrote screenplays for radio and television.

During his lyricist career, he wrote many songs for Milton Berle and Danny Thomas.

In 1949, he wrote the English lyrics to the French song "C'est si bon" that is recorded by Johnny Desmond with Tony Mottola and his Orchestra in January 1950.

On June 26, 1950, Louis Armstrong recorded the song with Sy Oliver and his Orchestra and his cover was a worldwide hit.

In 1951, Dolores Gray sings the song in the short film Holiday in Paris: Paris which is the first film where the song is sung in English.

Personal life
Jerry Seelen married in 1949 in Los Angeles the model Betty Hall (1923–2001). The couple had two children. They divorced in 1957.

Radio
 1943–1946: The Bird's Eye Open House
 1944–1951: Post Toasties Time
 1946–1947: Drene Time

Revues
 1942: New Priorities of 1943 (music by Lester Lee) at the Richard Rodgers Theatre.
 1942–1943: Star and Garter  (music by Lester Lee) at the Music Box Theatre.
 1943–1944: Ziegfeld Follies  (music by Lester Lee) at the Winter Garden Theatre and at the Imperial Theatre.

Cinema and television

Screenplays

Songs

References

External links 
 
 

1912 births
1981 deaths
American lyricists
American television writers
20th-century American screenwriters